Two ships in the United States Navy have been named USS Samoa:

 The first  was a steamship used in the South Pacific from 1917 to 1920.
 The second  was to have been used for a large cruiser, but it was cancelled in 1943.

United States Navy ship names